Ungerer is a surname. Notable people with the surname include:
Tomi Ungerer (1931–2019), a French illustrator, son of Théodore. A museum is dedicated to him in his hometown Strasbourg, the Musée Tomi Ungerer/Centre international de l’illustration.
Werner Ungerer (1927–2014), German diplomat, rector of the College of Europe
Hilarios Karl-Heinz Ungerer (born 1941), German Bishop of the Free Catholic Church
Joe Ungerer (1916–1990), American football player

Two Ungerer brothers assisted Jean-Baptiste Schwilgué (1776–1856)
in the construction of the third Strasbourg astronomical clock.

See also 
 Unger (disambiguation)

German-language surnames
Surnames of Hungarian origin
Ethnonymic surnames